Nordmark can mean:

Nordmark Hundred -  a district of Värmland in Sweden
the German name for the Northern March - a territorial organisation in Holy Roman Empire
Arbeitserziehungslager Nordmark a work camp from the Nazis
Kriegsmarine Nordmark - a vessel in the German Kriegsmarine of the Dithmarschen class
, a coaster in service 1926-36
Nordmarka, the Norwegian name for the North Mark which makes up the northern part of Oslo, Norway